SBAC may refer to:

 SBA Communications, a United States-based telecommunications company 
 Smarter Balanced Assessment Consortium, an American K-12 Common Core testing consortium
 The Society of British Aerospace Companies, a British national trade association